Emerson High School or Emerson School may refer to:
 Eldorado Emerson Private School, Orange, California
 Emerson School for Visual and Performing Arts, Indiana, United States
 Emerson High School (Indiana), United States
 Emerson High School (Union City, New Jersey), United States
 Emerson Jr./Sr. High School, New Jersey, United States